Timothy Zeph Jennings (born September 4, 1950) is an American politician who served as a member of the New Mexico Senate for the 32nd district from 1978 to 2012.

Early life and education 
Jennings was born in Roswell, New Mexico, in 1950. He graduated from the New Mexico Military Institute in 1968 and earned a Bachelor of Science degree in business administration from Creighton University in 1972.

Career 
Jennings served as majority whip from 1992 through 1996. Governor Susana Martinez heavily opposed him in the 2012 election and he was defeated by Republican Cliff Pirtle. Jennings is a friend of Republican National Committee member Harvey Yates Jr., who withdrew his support from Martinez after the 2012 election. After leaving the legislature, Jennings became a lobbyist in the healthcare industry.

References 

Democratic Party New Mexico state senators
1950 births
Living people
People from Roswell, New Mexico

People from Chaves County, New Mexico
New Mexico Military Institute alumni
Creighton University alumni